Bangalore South Lok Sabha constituency is one of the 28 Lok Sabha (Parliamentary) constituencies in Karnataka state in southern India. 
Currently the seat is held by Tejasvi Surya of Bharatiya Janata Party who won against B. K. Hariprasad of Indian National Congress by a margin of 3,31,192 votes in the 2019 Indian general election.

Assembly segments

At present, Bangalore South Lok Sabha constituency comprises the following 8 Legislative Assembly segments:

Members of Parliament

History of the constituency
Post independence Bangalore south constituency used to come under Mysore state. Mysore state was a state within the Union of India from 1947 until 1956. T. Madiah Gowda, freedom fighter, a lawyer by profession won in 1st lok sabha election from Bangalore south constituency.

As a result of the States Reorganisation Act on 1 November 1956 few constituencies were added to Karnataka state and Bangalore north and Bangalore south constituencies were merged to make Bangalore constituency. H.C Dasappa got elected from Bangalore constituency  from 1957 to 1962. He also served as the Railway Minister of India under Jawaharlal Nehru in 1963-64. Later former Chief Minister Kengal Hanumanthiah won this constituency three consecutive times.

Post Emergency and reorganization of constituencies across the country, this Lok Sabha seat came into existence as Bangalore South in 1977. Since then this constituency has gone to the polls 12 times. BJP has won 8 times, Janata Party 3 times and Congress just once. BJP leader Ananth Kumar won 6 consecutive terms from this constituency.

In 1977, K S Hegde (incidentally his son is the famous retired judge of Supreme Court, Santosh Hegde)  won this seat against former Chief Minister Kengal Hanumanthiah (who was instrumental in building Vidhana Soudha). He was a former judge of the Supreme Court who resigned in the mid 70's when he and 2 other judges were superseded in the Supreme Court, apparently for their past judgments against the government of the day. This was the only seat other than Hassan won by the Janata party in Karnataka. He went on to be the first non Congress Speaker of the Lok Sabha and was known for his disciplined and non-partisan tenure.

In 1980,  T. R. Shamanna, freedom fighter, an educationist, 4 time MLA before, and better known as Cycle Shamanna won the seat by Janata Party in that election. This was the only parliamentary seat won by Janata Party in Karnataka in that election. In this elections of 1980, Congress came back to power at the center with Indira Gandhi back at the helm.

In 1984, V. S. Krishna Iyer won the elections. The elections were necessitated due to the murder of Indira Gandhi sitting Prime Minister. Rajiv Gandhi called for elections and Congress went on to win a landslide. V. S. Krishna Iyer, a Gandhian, Congressman who later joined Congress (O) and then Janata. He was an ex Mayor of Bangalore and was responsible for sanctioning the Cauvery water supply scheme for Bangalore city. He was instrumental in founding of Yuvakasangha along with Gandhian V Annaiah in 1946 in Bangalore which popularized free tuition classes for 10th standard students apart from B.Com students.

1989 elections saw the Congress winning the seat for the first time with former Karnataka Chief Minister R. Gundu Rao winning the elections defeating V. S. Krishna Iyer. This is the only time that Congress has won the elections in this constituency.

1991 elections were necessitated when the Chandra Shekhar led government fell and elections were called. BJP fielded noted economist K Venkatagiri Gowda. He defeated the incumbent MP R. Gundu Rao and thus BJP won the elections for the 1st time in Bangalore South. BJP won 4 seats in this elections from Karnataka.

In 1996, BJP fielded an young candidate Ananth Kumar who won the elections against Varalakshmi Gundu Rao, wife of R Gundu Rao. He went on to win 5 consecutive elections. Interestingly all his nearest opponents were different candidates but they were all from Congress. Till the rise of Ananth Kumar the seat was won by legal luminaries, freedom fighters, Chief Minister and senior Economists. Ananth Kumar went on to become one of the most powerful and influential politicians from Karnataka, serving both the Vajpayee government and the Modi government in multiple capacities.

Anand Kumar succumbed to cancer in 2018 during the course of the 16th Lok Sabha, and in 2019, BJP was forced to field a new face due to his untimely death. Tejasvi Surya went on to win with over 3.3 lakh votes and at the age of 29 became one of the youngest MPs in the 17th Lok Sabha.

Election results

General Election 1998

General Election 1999

General Election 2004

General Election 2009

General Election 2014

General Election 2019

See also
 Bangalore
 List of Constituencies of the Lok Sabha

References

External links
Bangalore South lok sabha  constituency election 2019 date and schedule

Lok Sabha constituencies in Karnataka
Bangalore Urban district